The 2012–13 Marist Red Foxes men's basketball team represented Marist College during the 2012–13 NCAA Division I men's basketball season. The Red Foxes, led by fifth year head coach Chuck Martin, played their home games at the McCann Arena and were members of the Metro Atlantic Athletic Conference. The Red Foxes finished the season 10–21, 6–12 in MAAC play to finish eighth place. They lost in the first round of the MAAC tournament to Siena.

On March 14, 2013, head coach Chuck Martin was fired. He posted a record of 41–118 in five seasons. On April 10, 2013, Marist hired Jeff Bower as their new head coach.

Previous season 

The Red Foxes finished the 2011–12 season 14–18, 7–11 in MAAC play to finish in eighth place. They advanced to the quarterfinals of the MAAC tournament where they lost to Iona.

Roster

Schedule

|-
!colspan=9 style="background:#E51837; color:#FFFFFF;"| Regular season

|-
!colspan=9 style="background:#E51837; color:#FFFFFF;"| 2013 MAAC tournament

References

Marist Red Foxes men's basketball seasons
Marist
Marist Red Foxes men's basketball
Marist Red Foxes men's basketball